Vladimir Nikolajevich Pokrovskii (born 11 May 1934) is a Russian scientist known for his original contributions to polymer physics and economic theory. He was the founder of the Altai (Russia, Barnaul) school of dynamics of nonlinear fluids (Yurii Altukhov, Grigorii Pyshnograi and others).

Biography 
Pokrovskii was born May 11, 1934 into a Russian family in the rural locality Altayskoye, Altaysky District, Altai Krai (Russian: Алтайское, Алтайского края), Russia. He graduated from   Tomsk State University in Siberia as a physicist (Department of Theoretical Physics) in 1958 and in the same year was employed as a teacher of physics at Tomsk Polytechnic University. In 1964 he moved to the  Branch of Institute of Chemical Physics of the Academy of Sciences of the USSR (Chernogolovka,  Moscow region) where in positions of Senior Research Fellow was engaged in studying of suspensions and  polymers. He received the first Russian scientific degree (Candidate of Sciences, 1968) and the second Russian Degree (Doctor of Sciences, 1977) in Physics and Mathematics.	  Since 1980 Vladimir Nikolaevich has managed the Department of Applied Mathematics of the Altai Polytechnic Institute (now Altai State Technical University), (Barnaul, Russia), and in 1981 he was appointed Professor of Applied Mathematics.	 From 1987-1995 he was Professor and Head of the Department of Applied Mathematics at Moscow University of Economics, Statistics and Informatics (МЭСИ, the Russian abbreviation). He works on methods of modelling of economic processes and undertakes the studies in the field of the mathematical description of economic growth which has led to the  understanding of the role of energy and, eventually, to the formulation of the generalized labour theory of value.	

Since 1995  Vladimir Nikolaevich has been a visiting professor at Maltese University. He gives lectures on statistical physics and is engaged in research work. He now (2021) lives with his wife in Moscow,   and writes about his life in 'Notes'

Distinctions
Jubilee Medal "In Commemoration of the 100th Anniversary of the Birth of Vladimir Ilyich Lenin" (1970)

Research

Dynamics of suspensions
For description of dynamic behaviour of polymer solutions and molecular liquids,  suspensions of rigid or semi-rigid particles were  used as  simple heuristic models that allowed  to connect  the properties of moving systems with structural characteristics. The constitutive equations of  the flowing dilute suspension of rigid ellipsoids was apparently the first example of microrheological constitutive equations of complex fluid.  The usage of rigid ellipsoids model was also helpful in explaining of optical anisotropy and  relaxation phenomena of the molecular systems.  The suspension of rigid  particles in an anisotropic fluid provides a qualitative description of  behaviour of liquid crystals

Polymer dynamics
The   properties of polymers,  according to earlier hypothesis by Sam Edwards  and Pierre-Gilles de Gennes,  could be explained by a special movement of long macromolecule among other macromolecules   like a snake (via reptation). The development of the theory of stochastic thermal motion of long macromolecules among similar macromolecules (in the entangled system) confirms the existence of reptation in the region of molecular mass above 10 times the length between 'entanglements'   and  identifies the internal relaxation processes in polymers from the molecular point of view.  The theory has determined the  reliable foundation for the theory of viscoelasticity, diffusion and a number of other features of polymeric materials. The Pokrovskii's monograph  is included  into the Sunfoundry list of  the best books on dynamics of polymers. The theory is concerned with linear macromolecules, and  one needs in the extension of the theory   to macromolecules of  different structures  (in a form of a comb, a star, and others).

Econodynamics
The developed theory of social production is based on the achievements of classical political economy and presents  a clarification of the conventional, neoclassical theory of economic growth. The theory is formulated as empirical science on the creation, motion and disappearance of value. Considering  production factors, econodynamics  regards    two distinctive  characteristics  of the  production equipment: capital stock as value of production equipment  (production capital) and capital service as a substitute for labour. Capital service is considered, in line with workers' efforts,   as an independent production factor, whereas capital stock is considered to be the means of attracting labour and energy services to the production. Human effort and the work of external energy sources appears to be  the true sources of value; productivity of capital is eventually productivity of working people  and substitutive work. It  has led to the  understanding of the role of energy and, eventually, to the generalization of the  labour theory of value. The theory  allowed analysis the current situations in economies and to reconstruct the picture of production activity on the Earth in the previous millennia.

Dynamics of complex systems
Considering the complex systems, such as  polymers, living organisms, social organisations and so on, to be thermodynamic systems with some internal structure, the principles of nonequilibrium thermodynamics  have been reformulated, using the concept of internal variables that describe deviations of a thermodynamic system from the equilibrium state.  Considering the first law of thermodynamics, work of internal variables is introduced and internal thermal energy of non-equilibrium systems is taken into account. It is shown that the requirement that the thermodynamic system cannot fulfil any work via internal variables is equivalent to the conventional formulation of the second law of thermodynamics. These statements, in line with the axioms introducing internal variables can be considered as basic principles of nonequilibrium thermodynamics. It is shown that known linear parities between thermodynamic forces and fluxes and also the   entropy production, as a sum of products of thermodynamic forces and fluxes, are consequences (valid only in linear area and for steady-state situations)  of fundamental principles of thermodynamics. Among the numerous applications of non-equilibrium thermodynamics, it  appears to be a description of living organism as an open thermodynamic system, which allows formulating the thermodynamic equation of growth

References 

Russian physicists
1934 births
Living people
Tomsk State University alumni
People from Altai Krai